Hasan Sara, also known as Hanak Sara or Hasanak Sara, may refer to:
 Hasan Sara, Gilan
 Hasan Sara, Mazandaran